Kirkcaldy and Cowdenbeath is a county constituency representing the areas around the towns of Kirkcaldy and Cowdenbeath, in Fife, Scotland, in the House of Commons of the Parliament of the United Kingdom. It is currently represented by Alba Party politician Neale Hanvey.

It was previously represented by former Prime Minister Gordon Brown from 2005 until 2015, who had been MP for the Dunfermline East constituency from 1983-2005 until boundary changes. He served as Chancellor of the Exchequer from 1997 to 2007 and as UK Prime Minister from 2007 to 2010.

Boundaries 

The Fife Council wards of Aberdour and Burntisland West; Auchtertool and Burntisland East; Ballingry and Lochore; Bennochy and Valley; Cowdenbeath Central; Crosshill and Lochgelly North; Dalgety Bay East; Dalgety Bay West and Hillend; Dunnikier; Dysart and Gallatown; Glebe Park, Pathhead and Sinclairtown; Hayfield and Balsusney; Kelty; Kinghorn and Invertiel; Linktown and Kirkcaldy Central; Lumphinnans and Lochgelly South; Oakfield and Cowdenbeath North; Raith and Longbraes; Smeaton and Overton; Templehall East; and Templehall West.

The constituency is bounded by Ochil and South Perthshire to the north, Dunfermline and West Fife to the west and Glenrothes to the east.

Along with Kirkcaldy and Cowdenbeath, the towns of Burntisland, Dalgety Bay, Dysart, Kelty, and Lochgelly and the villages of Aberdour, Auchtertool, Ballingry, Crosshill, Glencraig, Kinghorn, Lochore and Lumphinnans make up the constituency.

Members of Parliament 
The first Member of Parliament after the seat's creation in 2005, was the then Chancellor of the Exchequer, Gordon Brown; who had previously represented Dunfermline East from 1983 to 2005, and later succeeded Tony Blair as Prime Minister in 2007. At the general election of 2010, Brown was re-elected as an MP, but was defeated as Prime Minister, and soon resigned as Leader of the Labour Party. He announced that he would continue to serve as an Opposition backbencher, and did not retire from the Commons until the 2015 general election, which he did not contest. On that occasion, the SNP won parliamentary representation in the area for the first time, in line with the party's landslide victory throughout Scotland at that election. In 2017, Labour regained the seat from the SNP, with Lesley Laird winning over the SNP incumbent Roger Mullin by 259 votes. Laird was appointed Shadow Secretary of State for Scotland less than a week later on 14 June 2017.

In 2019, Neale Hanvey unseated Laird with a majority of 1,243 votes. Hanvey was suspended from the SNP before the election for use of anti-Semitic language in social media posts. Although Hanvey was suspended from the SNP, he was still listed as such on the ballot and his victory is recorded as an SNP gain from Labour. It is the only known time in which a candidate has won a seat and sat as an independent following a suspension from their party. He was later re-admitted to the party in June 2020. Hanvey defected from the SNP to join the new Alba Party in late March 2021, becoming Alba's second MP after Kenny MacAskill of East Lothian.

Election results

Elections in the 2010s 

1After nominations for the 2019 general election closed, the Scottish National Party suspended Neale Hanvey and withdrew all support for his campaign on 28 November 2019 due to allegations of antisemitism.

Elections in the 2000s

See also 
 Politics of Scotland
 List of current MPs for Scottish constituencies

References 

Politics of Fife
Westminster Parliamentary constituencies in Scotland
Constituencies of the Parliament of the United Kingdom established in 2005
Constituencies of the Parliament of the United Kingdom represented by a sitting Prime Minister
2005 establishments in Scotland
Cowdenbeath
Kirkcaldy
Lochgelly